Alexandra Guiné (born 7 November 1985) is a French former football midfielder that played in the French First Division for ESOF La Roche, CNFE Clairefontaine and FCF Juvisy, also playing the UEFA Women's Cup with the latter. She earned three caps for the French national team in 2005, and as a junior international she won the 2003 U-19 European Championship.

References

External links
 
 

1985 births
Living people
French women's footballers
France women's international footballers
CNFE Clairefontaine players
Paris FC (women) players
Women's association football midfielders
Division 1 Féminine players
People from La Roche-sur-Yon
Sportspeople from Vendée
Footballers from Pays de la Loire
France women's youth international footballers